Home Game is a sports documentary web television series. The series profiles unique and dangerous traditional sports from around the world, as well as the communities and cultures where they thrive. The series premiered on Netflix on 26 June 2020 and is narrated by Mark Strong.

Episodes

Season 1

Release
Home Game was released on June 26, 2020, on Netflix.

References

External links
 
 
 Home Game - Boardwalk Pictures

2020 American television series debuts
2020s American documentary television series
Documentary television series about sports
English-language Netflix original programming
Netflix original documentary television series
Television series by Boardwalk Pictures